= Ozmas =

Christmas celebration in the Australian winter

Ozmas is a Christmas celebration in the Australian winter.

Since the 19th Century, European immigrants to Australia have recognised Christmas's roots as a celebration of mid-winter and have explored ways of celebrating the shortest day of the year. The name "Ozmas" comes from combining 'Australia' and 'Christmas'.

The event has also been known as Christmas in July.
